Agonidium kahuzianum is a species of ground beetle in the subfamily Platyninae. It was described by Basilewsky in 1975.

References

kahuzianum
Beetles described in 1975